General Woodward may refer to:

Daniel P. Woodward (fl. 1980s–2009s), U.S. Air Force brigadier general
Eric Woodward (1899–1967), Australian Army lieutenant general
George A. Woodward (1835–1916), U.S. Army brigadier general
Gilbert H. Woodward (1916–1973), U.S. Army lieutenant general
Margaret H. Woodward (born 1960), U.S. Air Force major general
Thomas Simpson Woodward (1797–1859), U.S. Army general